The Cornmill Stream and Old River Lea is a  biological Site of Special Scientific Interest in Waltham Abbey, Essex.

Location 
The site is bounded by a channel of the Old River Lea to the north and west which formed a boundary with the former Royal Gunpowder Mills. To the east flows the Cornmill Stream and the southern boundary is formed by the B194 road (Abbey View).

Habitat 
The slow-moving Cornmill Stream and Old River Lea form a freshwater habitat with one of the most diverse invertebrate fauna in Essex. Eighteen species of dragonflies and damselflies have been recorded and includes the uncommon and nationally declining white-legged damselfly. The watercourses support a rich and varied aquatic and marginal flora and the site also includes rough grassland which provides feeding and breeding grounds for invertebrates and birds.

References 

Sites of Special Scientific Interest in Essex
Sites of Special Scientific Interest notified in 1986
Lee Valley Park
Waltham Abbey